Ján Michalko (born 18 November 1947) is a Slovak cross-country skier. He competed at the 1972 Winter Olympics and the 1976 Winter Olympics.

References

1947 births
Living people
Slovak male cross-country skiers
Olympic cross-country skiers of Czechoslovakia
Cross-country skiers at the 1972 Winter Olympics
Cross-country skiers at the 1976 Winter Olympics
People from Liptovský Mikuláš District
Sportspeople from the Žilina Region